Jillian Terceira is a competitive equestrian show jumper based out of Geel, Belgium and is of Bermudan origin. Some of the horses she has successfully competed on include Navanta and Bernadien van Westuur. Terceira competed in the 2008 Summer Olympics and 2012 Summer Olympics on Bermuda's behalf in the individual jumping event.

References

External links

Living people
Equestrians at the 2008 Summer Olympics
Equestrians at the 2012 Summer Olympics
Olympic equestrians of Bermuda
Bermudian female equestrians
1971 births
Equestrians at the 2007 Pan American Games
Equestrians at the 2011 Pan American Games
Equestrians at the 2015 Pan American Games
Pan American Games competitors for Bermuda